The Kindred is a group of humanoid animals. They were introduced in a four-issue comic book mini-series published by Image Comics in 1994. Its writers were Jim Lee, Brandon Choi, Sean Ruffner and Brett Booth, who was also the artist. A second mini-series was published in 2002 under the Wildstorm imprint. Brett Booth was the sole writer and artist this time. Both series featured Grifter and Backlash fighting the Kindred.

The Kindred (1994)
This series stars Grifter and Backlash on a mission to rescue John Lynch and his assistant Alicia Turner. Lynch and Turner had been kidnapped by a man called Bloodmoon and his group of mutated animals, the Kindred. They took them to Caballito Island to stand trial for Lynch's crimes. Backlash is recruited by International Operations to save their agents Lynch and Turner. In return he would get help for his comatose girlfriend, Diane LeSalle. Grifter becomes involved to save Alicia Turner, a close friend.

On Cabalitto Island, Bloodmoon captures them and reveals his true identity. He was Robert Diaz, a former member of Team 7 and he blames his Team 7 colleagues, especially Backlash, for leaving him for dead on a mission in South-America. Diaz survived, escaped to Caballito Island and found the Kindred, the result of an I.O. experiment with the Gen-Factor on animals. This ended up turning animals into intelligent, humanoid creatures with superhuman abilities. Congress found out and the experiment was cancelled and its subjects killed, but several escaped. I.O. figured that they would kill each other, but instead they organize and become the Kindred. Lynch had been involved with the Kindred experiment and therefore the Kindred swore vengeance against him. United in their hatred, Diaz joins the Kindred and became its leader. He read through the files left on the island and started taking an experimental version of the Gen-factor, known as the Gen-serum. The serum turns him superhumanly strong, but also insane.

Lynch, Grifter and Backlash managed to defeat the Kindred and escape the island, but Grifter tries to save Diaz from a collapsing bridge. Slayton saves Grifter, but was unable to save Diaz as well, forced to leave him for dead again. When they left the island by helicopter, Lynch contacts his boss, Miles Craven, for an update, but Craven ordered the destruction of Caballito Island, using a special satellite. Grifter blames Backlash for Diaz' apparent death.

Despite the island being almost completely destroyed, Bloodmoon and the Kindred would later turn up alive, partly because they had been on parts of the island that weren't hit by Craven's satellite, partly because there were Kindred on nearby islands as well.

The Kindred II (2002)
Backlash and his friend, Dingo, also a Kindred, are sent to Griffis Air Force base to investigate multiple murders and theft. Dingo quickly concludes that the attackers were Kindred. Grifter catches a news report about the attack on the Air Force base and decides to investigate as well. Grifter and Backlash start arguing and Dingo leaves them alone. As he does, the two are attacked by reptilian Kindred, but saved and taken by mammalian Kindred.

The mammalian Kindred reveal the ability to turn into humans (though their eyes are still inhuman) and tell Grifter and Backlash that the reptilian Kindred stole more Gen-serum and neural inhibitors from I.O.-bases, so they could create their own army of Kindred. They also explain that the different Kindred-tribes have started warring and some have moved to different islands: Avian Kindred are isolationists, Reptillians are aggressive and the Mammals are peaceful.

Grifter and Backlash help the mammals against the Reptilian, with the Kindred Silver becoming quite attracted to Grifter, much to the amusement of Backlash. During their fight with Reptilian leader Kronos, Grifter is turned into a Kindred as well. Backlash manages to stir Grifter's memory and he turns against Kronos, destroying the devices that allow Kronos to control the other Kindred. Kronos escapes and Grifter's already active Gen-Factor reverts him to human. Taboo and Dingo arrive to take them back and Backlash asks Dingo to stay with the Kindred and give them leadership. At the end Grifter and Backlash end their long-running feud and become friends again.

Other appearances of Kindred
 The Kindred, including Bloodmoon, made various appearances in Backlash's solo-series and one Kindred, Dingo, became a recurrent supporting character. In Backlash's own book, they would team up to confront Uni-Com, a company threatening the Kindred. They also confront Gramalkin, a human-Kindred hybrid who was not in control of his own actions. Backlash gets Gramalkin a job working with PSI, a governmental genetics organization.
 DV8 had their own base on Caballito Island and once came into contact with the Kindred. These stories introduced the rivalry between the 'good' mammal Kindred and the 'evil' reptilian Kindred. One of the reptilian Kindred was responsible for turning Bliss evil by possessing her.

1994 comics debuts
2002 comics debuts
WildStorm limited series
WildStorm superhero teams